Sariah Paki  (born 12 May 2001) is an Australian rugby union player.

Personal life
Her sister Aaliyah Paki has played touch football for the Parramatta Eels in the NRL Touch Premiership in Australia.

Career
Paki was named in the Australia squad for the Rugby sevens at the 2020 Summer Olympics.  The team came second in the pool round but then lost to Fiji 14-12 in the quarterfinals.

Paki won a gold medal with the Australian sevens team at the 2022 Commonwealth Games in Birmingham. She was a member of the Australian team that won the 2022 Sevens Rugby World Cup held in Cape Town, South Africa in September 2022.

References 

2001 births
Living people
Australian rugby union players
Australian female rugby sevens players
Olympic rugby sevens players of Australia
Rugby sevens players at the 2020 Summer Olympics
Rugby sevens players at the 2022 Commonwealth Games
Commonwealth Games gold medallists for Australia
Commonwealth Games medallists in rugby sevens
Medallists at the 2022 Commonwealth Games